Temnora fumosa is a moth of the family Sphingidae. It is found in most habitats throughout Africa south of the Sahara.

The forewings are olive brown to dark olive brown, with several oblique darker bands, which are less visible in dark specimens. The apical area is somewhat paler. There is a greyish mark at the costa. The hindwings are darker brown and unmarked. The abdominal tufts of the male are fairly bright red.

Subspecies
Temnora fumosa fumosa
Temnora fumosa albuquerqueae Darge, 1970 (São Tomé and Príncipe)
Temnora fumosa chanudeti Turlin, 1996 (Comoro Islands)

References

Temnora
Moths described in 1856
Moths of Madagascar
Moths of Sub-Saharan Africa
Lepidoptera of Southern Africa
Insects of the Central African Republic
Moths of the Comoros
Lepidoptera of Gabon
Moths of São Tomé and Príncipe
Insects of Seychelles
Lepidoptera of Tanzania